Sgurr Mor (1,003 m) is a mountain in the Northwest Highlands of Scotland, on the southern side of Loch Quoich in Lochaber.

A steep and rugged peak, Sgurr Mor is one of the most remote Munros in Scotland and also one of the hardest to reach. It is usually climbed from the head of Loch Arkaig to the south.

References

Mountains and hills of the Northwest Highlands
Marilyns of Scotland
Munros
One-thousanders of Scotland